Joseph Barry Brown (April 17, 1943- February 6, 2020) was an American former college and professional football player who was a linebacker and tight end in the National Football League (NFL) and American Football League (AFL) for five seasons during the 1960s and early 1970s.  Brown played college football for the University of Florida, and was drafted in nineteenth round of the 1965 NFL Draft.  He played professionally for the Baltimore Colts, New York Giants and Boston Patriots.

Early years 

Brown was born in Boston, Massachusetts.  He graduated from Ann Arbor High School in Ann Arbor, Michigan, and he played for the Ann Arbor Pioneers high school football team.

College career 

Brown attended the University of Florida, where he played for coach Ray Graves' Florida Gators football team, lettering in 1964 and 1965.  In the mid-1960s, when college football rules still required players to play both ways, Brown played linebacker on defense and tight end on offense.  As a senior in 1965, he was a second-team All-Southeastern Conference (SEC) selection.  Memorably, he caught nine passes from Gators quarterback Steve Spurrier in the 1966 Sugar Bowl—which remains tied for the third-most receptions in a single game in Gators history.  He graduated from the university with a bachelor's degree in health and human performance in 1965.

Professional career 

He played in twenty-four regular season games for the Colts, all off the bench. In , he played twelve games at linebacker for the New York Giants. In two seasons as an offensive lineman and eligible receiver, he caught twenty-one passes for 214 yards.

See also 

 Florida Gators football, 1960–69
 List of Florida Gators in the NFL Draft
 List of New England Patriots players
 List of New York Giants players
 List of University of Florida alumni

References

Bibliography 

 Carlson, Norm, University of Florida Football Vault: The History of the Florida Gators, Whitman Publishing, LLC, Atlanta, Georgia (2007).  .
 Golenbock, Peter, Go Gators!  An Oral History of Florida's Pursuit of Gridiron Glory, Legends Publishing, LLC, St. Petersburg, Florida (2002).  .
 Hairston, Jack, Tales from the Gator Swamp: A Collection of the Greatest Gator Stories Ever Told, Sports Publishing, LLC, Champaign, Illinois (2002).  .
 McCarthy, Kevin M.,  Fightin' Gators: A History of University of Florida Football, Arcadia Publishing, Mount Pleasant, South Carolina (2000).  .
 McEwen, Tom, The Gators: A Story of Florida Football, The Strode Publishers, Huntsville, Alabama (1974).  .
 Nash, Noel, ed., The Gainesville Sun Presents The Greatest Moments in Florida Gators Football, Sports Publishing, Inc., Champaign, Illinois (1998).  .

1943 births
Living people
Players of American football from Ann Arbor, Michigan
Players of American football from Boston
American football linebackers
American football tight ends
Florida Gators football players
Baltimore Colts players
New York Giants players
Boston Patriots players